ZTR can mean:

 Zaporozhtransformator, Ukrainian transformer company
 ZTR Zaporizhia, handball club, Ukraine
 Zhytomyr International Airport, IATA code